The Last Tattoo is a 1994 feature film set in World War II, Wellington, New Zealand.

Plot 
During World War II Wellington, New Zealand has U.S. servicemen mingling with the local female population. In such circumstances Kelly Towne, a public health nurse, has got the task of tracking down venereal diseases. She meets U.S. Marine Captain Michael Starwood who is investigating the murder of a U.S. marine.

Cast

Reviews 
 1995 featured in New Zealand's contribution to the British Film Institute's Century of Cinema series - Cinema of Unease: A Personal Journey by Sam Neill.
 1994 Cinema Papers New Zealand Supplement.
 1994 Variety review.

References

External links 
 

1994 films
1990s New Zealand films
1990s English-language films